Agarici is a surname. People with this surname include:

 Horia Agarici (1911–1982), Romanian aviator
 Viorica Agarici (1886–1979), Romanian nurse

See also
Agarici can be a term used in connection with Agaricus fungi, as in Pseudomonas agarici

Romanian-language surnames